This is a list of national conventions of Kappa Kappa Psi (ΚΚΨ), National Honorary Band Fraternity, and Tau Beta Sigma (ΤΒΣ), National Honorary Band Sorority. The two organizations hold joint national conventions every two years in odd-numbered years.

The national convention serves as the governing body of each respective organization. National conventions are called to order in joint sessions, then recessed to allow the two organizations to hold their own separate business sessions before returning to a final joint session to end the convention.

Kappa Kappa Psi national conventions 

The first national convention of Kappa Kappa Psi was held in 1922, on the campus of Oklahoma A&M College in Stillwater. The next several conventions were held in Oklahoma City, and beginning in 1939, conventions were held on college campuses around the country. Conventions were held on college campuses until 1995, when the size of the delegations of Kappa Kappa Psi and Tau Beta Sigma were so large that the organizations were forced to move to convention centers and hotels.

Tau Beta Sigma conventions 

The first national convention of Tau Beta Sigma was held in 1946 on the campus of Texas Tech, home of the Beta chapter. After this, each national convention of Tau Beta Sigma has been held concurrently with the national convention of Kappa Kappa Psi.

References 

Kappa Kappa Psi
Tau Beta Sigma
Kappa Kappa Psi and Tau Beta Sigma